Current 93 are an English experimental music group, working since the early 1980s in folk-based musical forms. The band was founded in 1982 by David Tibet, who has been Current 93's only constant member.

Background
Tibet has been the only constant member in the group, though Steven Stapleton (of Nurse with Wound) has appeared on nearly every Current 93 release. Michael Cashmore has also been a constant contributor since Thunder Perfect Mind. Douglas P. of Death in June has played on well over a dozen Current 93 releases, and Steve Ignorant of Crass (using the name Stephen Intelligent), Boyd Rice, runologist Freya Aswynn, Nick Cave, Björk, Andrew W.K., Anohni, Baby Dee, Will Oldham, Ben Chasny, Rose McDowall, have also lent their talents over the years.

Current 93 have released over twenty albums and many singles as well.

Much of Current 93's early work was similar to late 1970s and early 1980s industrial music: abrasive tape loops, droning synthesizer noises and Tibet's distorted, excoriating vocals. 

Tibet's lyrics have been fairly consistent, regardless of delivery: The  earlier recordings reflect his preoccupation with death, Christ, mysticism, Aleister Crowley (Tibet borrowed the term "93 Current" from Crowley – the 93 Current being the current of Thelema or Agape), Tibetan Buddhism, Gnosticism, runes, swastikas, Noddy, The Wicker Man, and a variety of occult notions. The later to present-day period of Current 93's recordings increasingly reflect Tibet's interest in Christian mysticism and apocalypse. Tibet has stated that he identifies as a Christian.

Literary influences include Lautreamont's Les Chants de Maldoror, the Bible, The Poetic Eddas, Hildegard von Bingen, John Dee's De Heptarchia Mystica, The Thunder, Perfect Mind, William Blake, Louis Wain, writer Thomas Ligotti, occult British author Arthur Machen (originator of the title "The Inmost Light"), M.R. James's various ghost stories, The Cloud of Unknowing, Count Eric Stenbock, and Russell Hoban's Riddley Walker.

Discography

Primary, full-length, Current 93 studio albums

Full discography

Compilation appearances
"Black Ships Ate the Sky (Alternate Mix)" on Brainwaves (2006)

Current 93 Presents releases

 1986 Aleister Crowley – The Hastings Archives/The World As Power LP
 1988 The Venerable 'Chi.med Rig. 'dzin Lama, Rinpoche – Tantric rNying.ma Chant of Tibet LP/CD
 1990 Harry Oldfield – Crystal LP/CD
 1990 Sveinbjorn Beinteinsson – Edda LP/CD
 1992 Shirley Collins – Fountain of Snow CD
 1995 Tiny Tim – Songs of an Impotent Troubadour CD
 1997 The Aryan Aquarians – Meet Their Waterloo LP/CD

Sheet music 
Music sheets for piano and voice were released in 2017 by Terentyev Music Publishing Company, containing the album Soft Black Stars. The digital version is the complete music transcription of the album. The printed version contains piano notation and the lyrics (but not the vocal lines) and provides a complete overview of which melodies and harmonies each song from Soft Black Stars should be improvised around, "to make your own stars" as David Tibet writes. The press-release says "It was, indeed, in this way that the Soft Black Stars were created during the recording sessions and in concerts."

References

External links

 Official archive at Brainwashed, extensive discography, live information archive, related literary sources.
 David Tibet – C93 interview extensive interview with David Tibet from the Judas Kiss site, conducted in 2006
 Current 93 at Bandcamp
 
 

 
British industrial music groups
English experimental musical groups
Psychedelic folk groups
Neofolk music groups
British musical trios
Musical groups established in 1982
Musical groups from London